The experiences of women in war have been diverse. Historically women have played more than major roles on the home front. Citing Queen Boudica, Queen Elizabeth I, Catherine de' Medici, Catherine the Great, Maria Theresa, Golda Meir, Indira Gandhi, Aba women and Margaret Thatcher, British historian Andrew Roberts concludes: "The witness of history is virtually uniform in the willingness of female decision makers to fight, once they have decided the causes just and/or necessary."

Below the level of queens and prime ministers, throughout history, some women accompanied armies assigned combat missions, usually handling roles such as cooking and laundry, as relations and camp followers. They sewed bandages, rubbed cow pat as 'medicine' and other medical equipment for the soldiers. Women worked in munitions factories. Nursing became a major role starting in the middle 19th century. The main role in World War I (1914-1918) was employment in munitions factories, farming, and other roles to replace men drafted for the army. Women played an important role in making the system of food rationing work. World War II (1939-1945) marked a decisive turning point, with millions of women handling important homefront roles, such as working in munitions factories and otherwise replacing drafted men. Volunteer roles expanded. The most dramatic new change was millions of women in regular military units. Typically they handled clerical roles so that some men could be released for combat. Many women in the Soviet Union, Nazi Germany and the United Kingdom fought in combat roles especially in anti-aircraft units, where they shot down enemy bombers.  Underground and resistance movements made extensive use of women in combat roles. Reaction set in after 1945, and the roles allowed to women was sharply reduced in all major armies. Restarting in the 1970s, women played an increasing role in the military of major nations, including by 2005 roles as combat pilots. The new combat roles were highly controversial for many reasons including differences in physical capabilities of the sexes  and issues of gender identity for both women and men.

History
History of women in the military
Women in warfare and the military in the ancient era
Women in warfare and the military in the medieval era
Women in the Crusades
Roles of women, children, and class
Women in warfare and the military in the early modern era
 Timeline of women in early modern warfare
Women in warfare and the military (1750–1799)
Women in warfare and the military in the 19th century
List of female American Civil War soldiers
Timeline of women in 19th century warfare
Women in warfare and the military (1900–1939)
Women in warfare and the military (1900–1945)
Women in warfare and the military (1945–1999)

World War I
Women's roles in the World Wars
Women in the First World War
Home front during World War I
Australian women during World War I
Belgium in World War I
British home front during the First World War
Canadian women during the World Wars
History of Germany during World War I
United States home front during World War I

World War II
Women's roles in the World Wars
Code Girls
Home front during World War II
United States home front during World War II
Canadian women during the World Wars
Soviet women in World War II

21st century conflicts
Women in the War in Donbas

Contemporary
Women in the military by country
Women in the military in the Americas
Women in the military in Europe
Women in warfare and the military (2000–present)
Women in combat
Women in the military

See also
 Gender in security studies
Wartime cross-dressing
 List of wartime cross-dressers
 Timeline of women in warfare in the United States from 1900 to 1949
 Timeline of women in war in the United States, Pre-1945
 Timeline of women in warfare in the United States from 1950 to 1999 
 Timeline of women in warfare and the military in the United States, 2000–2010
 Timeline of women in warfare and the military in the United States from 2011–present

Notes

Further reading
Clarke, R.D., 2022. Women and/in War. In: Kurtz, L.R. (Ed.), Encyclopedia of Violence, Peace, and Conflict, vol. 2. Elsevier, Academic Press, pp. 332–343. https://dx.doi.org/10.1016/B978-0-12-820195-4.00114-X.
Cook, Bernard, ed.  Women and War: Historical Encyclopedia from Antiquity to the Present (2006).
Elshtain, Jean Bethke. Women and War (1995)
Elshtain Jean, and Sheila Tobias, eds. Women, Militarism, and War (1990)
 Hacker, Barton C. and Margaret Vining, eds. A Companion to Women's Military History (Brill, 2012), 625pp; 16 long essays by leading scholars stretching from the Ancient to the contemporary world
Jones, David. Women Warriors: A History (Brassey's, 1997)
Pennington, Reina. Amazons to Fighter Pilots: A Biographical Dictionary of Military Women  (2003).
Salmonson, Jessica Amanda. The Encyclopedia of Amazons: Women Warriors from Antiquity to the Modern Era''  (1991).